The Ministry of Environment and Water is a Bulgarian government ministry responsible for environment protection.

The predecessor of the ministry is the Environmental Protection Committee attached to the Council of Ministers and established on 19 June 1976. It was elevated to a Ministry of Environment in 1990 and has its current structure since 1997.

References

External links
 

Environment and Water
Bulgaria
Bulgaria
1976 establishments in Bulgaria